Mathias Soggemoen (5 October 1847 – 1929) was a Norwegian railway worker, mountain climbing pioneer and guide.

Mathias Johnsen Soggemoen was born the oldest of seven siblings in Rauma in Møre og Romsdal, Norway.  In 1875, he married Ingeborg Olsdatter Sogge Brekken and settled at the village of Veblungsnes. They were the parents of nine children. Later in life, Mathias and Ingeborg Soggemoen emigrated to America with several of their children.

Soggemoen is known for a number of first ascents of Norwegian mountains. Among his first ascents are Store Austanbotntind (1883, with Carl Hall), Store Styggedalstinden (1883, with Hall), Midtre Skagastølstind (1884, with Hall), Hjelledalstind (1884, with Hall), Storebjørn (1884, with Hall), and Sentraltind (1885, with Hall and Torger S. Sulheim). He also climbed Romsdalshornet in 1881.
In 1886 Soggemoen and Hall made the first known ascent of Saksi ( 2,189 m.a.s.l.).

References

1847 births
1929 deaths
People from Rauma, Norway
Norwegian mountain climbers
Mountain guides
Norwegian emigrants to the United States
Sportspeople from Møre og Romsdal